Go Woo-ri (born February 22, 1988), better known by the mononym Woori or as Go Na-eun is a South Korean singer, rapper and actress. She was a member of the South Korean girl group Rainbow and its sub-group, Rainbow Blaxx.

Early life 
Go Woo-ri was born in Jeonju, South Korea on February 22, 1988. She studied at Daejeon Arts High School and Korea National Sport University. She was formerly a trainee at SM Entertainment before switching to DSP Media.

Career

2009–2016: Rainbow and Rainbow Blaxx

On November 12, 2009, Woori debuted as the main rapper of the girl group Rainbow with the release of extended play Gossip Girl. Since then, Rainbow has released seven EPs and two studio albums.

In January 2014, DSP announced Woori, alongside member Jaekyung, Seungah, and Hyunyoung, would form Rainbow's second sub-unit. On January 20, 2014, the sub-unit named Rainbow Blaxx debut with the release of extended play RB Blaxx.

On October 27, 2016, DSP announced Rainbow would disband on November 12 as the members contract were to expired.

2010–present: Solo activities
In 2010, Woori made her debut as an actress in the film Heartbeat.

On November 10, 2011, she was cast in the film You're My Pet. In October 2011, Woori was cast in the second season of Invincible Youth.

On February 27, 2012, she made her drama debut in KBS2's I Need a Fairy.

In 2013, she was cast in The Clinic for Married Couples: Love and War. She also cameo in Reply 1994.

She was then cast as a supporting role in the drama Glorious Day (2014) and Flower of Queen (2015).

In 2016, she was cast with her first main role in Start Again.

On January 10, 2018, it was announced that Woori changed her stage name to Go Na-eun.

In January 2018, she was cast in Yeonnam-dong 539. She was then cast in the horror film The Whispering. In July, she was cast in My Only One.

In 2019, she was cast in Love in Sadness. On November 3, 2019, it was announced that she changed her stage name back to Go Woo-ri.

In 2020, she was cast in True Beauty. In 2021, she was cast in Hello, Me!.

Personal life 
In June 2022, Go's agency confirmed that she is in a relationship with a businessman who is more than 5 years older.

Later, on August 4, it was announced that she will marry on October 3. They got married on October 3, 2022, in presence of friends and family in Seocho District, Seoul.

Discography

Filmography

Film

Television series

Web series

Television show

Ambassadorship 
Help Animals Ambassador, Animal Protection Group (2022)

References

External links

 
 

1988 births
Living people
People from Jeonju
Rainbow (girl group)
Japanese-language singers of South Korea
South Korean female idols
South Korean women rappers
South Korean women pop singers
South Korean female models
South Korean television presenters
South Korean women television presenters
South Korean film actresses
South Korean television actresses
21st-century South Korean women singers
21st-century South Korean singers
21st-century South Korean actresses
DSP Media artists